The 1989 Soviet Top League season was the 52nd since its establishment. Dnepr Dnepropetrovsk, the defending 2-times champions, came in second this season. 

The season began on 11 March with six games played on the date and lasted until 27 October 1990. The season was won by FC Spartak Moscow.

Teams

Promoted teams
 FC Pamir Dushanbe – champion (debut)
 FC Rotor Volgograd – 2nd place (returning for the first time since 1950 after 39 seasons, known as Torpedo Stalingrad)

Location

Final standings

Results

Top scorers
16 goals
 Sergey Rodionov (Spartak Moscow)

13 goals
 Georgi Kondratyev (Chornomorets)

11 goals
 Igor Dobrovolsky (Dinamo Moscow)
 Vladimir Grechnev (Torpedo Moscow)
 Igor Kolyvanov (Dinamo Moscow)
 Yuri Savichev (Torpedo Moscow)
 Valeri Shmarov (Spartak Moscow)

10 goals
 Mykola Kudrytsky (Dnipro)

9 goals
 Mikhail Rusyayev (Lokomotiv Moscow)
 Yuri Tarasov (Metalist)

Clean sheets

17 matches
 Stanislav Cherchesov (Spartak Moscow)

13 matches
 Valeri Sarychev (Torpedo Moscow)

11 matches
 Andrei Manannikov (Pamir Dushanbe)
 Valdemaras Martinkenas (Zalgiris Vilnius)

10 matches
 Viktor Chanov (Dynamo Kyiv)

9 matches
 Dmitriy Kharine (Dynamo Moscow)
 Valeriy Horodov (Dnipro Dnipropetrovsk)
 Ihor Kutepov (Metalist Kharkiv)
 Mykhailo Mykhailov (Shakhtar Donetsk)

Medal squads
(league appearances and goals listed in brackets)

Number of teams by union republic

References

External links
1989 season at FootballFacts.ru
1989 season. RSSSF
25 лет последнему «полному» чемпионату СССР: судьбы клубов. www.championat.com
Чемпионат СССР по футболу 1989. Спартак – Чемпион. Романцев против Лобановского. dzen.ru

Soviet Top League seasons
1
Soviet
Soviet